Dr. Praeger's is an all-natural, frozen foods company based in Elmwood Park, New Jersey.  The company was founded in 1994 and run by practicing cardiac surgeons Dr. Peter Praeger and Dr. Eric Somberg and their families.

Dr. Praeger’s produces about 30 items in the following categories: veggie burgers, veggie-potato pancakes, appetizers/snacks/side dishes, breaded fish, gefilte fish, and kids’ products. Dr. Praeger’s products are all-natural, preservative-free, Kosher, dairy free, free of artificial flavors and colors and MSG, trans-fat free and most are also low in cholesterol, sodium and/or saturated fats.  The products are distributed across the United States and internationally in Canada, Europe, South America and Israel. In 2020, Dr. Praeger’s won the Lausanne Index Prize - Food Clean Prize.

History
One of the brand’s first and most popular products, the California Veggie Burger, was inspired by Dr. Praeger’s patients, who complained about a lack of healthy and tasty food that they could eat after surgery. After months of ingredient research and taste testing, Dr. Praeger created the California Veggie Burger, which contains carrots, spinach, peas, edamame, and oat bran.

Dr. Praeger’s also has a line of products for people who cannot consume gluten. 
These products include:
Broccoli Littles,
Broccoli Pancakes,
Gluten-Free California Veggie Burgers,
Kale Veggie Burgers,
Potato Littles,
Quinoa and Herb Crusted Fillets,
Rice Crusted Fishies,
Rice Crusted Fish Fillets,
Rice Crusted Fish Sticks,
Root Vegetable Pancakes,
Southern Cornmeal Crusted Cod,
Spinach Littles,
Spinach Pancakes,
Sweet Potato Littles,
Sweet Potato Pancakes,
Thai Coconut Crusted Fillets, and
Zucchini & Carrot Pancakes.

Dr. Praeger died on September 22, 2012, in Hackensack, New Jersey, at age 65. He had been undergoing treatment for prostate cancer.

After the death of Dr. Peter Praeger in 2012 the company underwent management restructuring. In late 2013 it was announced that Larry Praeger, the son of company co-founder Dr. Peter Praeger, would succeed his father as the CEO of Dr. Praeger’s. Larry Praeger had previously served as vice president of the company during his 14-year tenure. The management restructuring also appointed Adam Somberg, the son of company co-founder Dr. Eric Somberg as President.

See also
Gluten-free diet
Gluten-free, casein-free diet
Gluten sensitivity
 List of frozen food brands

References

External links
 Official site

Frozen food brands